ξ Cygni (Latinised as Xi Cygni) is a spectroscopic binary star in the constellation Cygnus.

The system contains two stars which orbit every 18 years in a mildly eccentric orbit. The primary star is a supergiant with a spectral type of around K4, while the secondary is an A-type main-sequence star with a spectral type of A1.5. Stellar winds from the supergiant have been measured at around 50 km/s, but with variations in speed and individual line strengths.

ξ Cygni is in the Kepler spacecraft's field of view but no planets have been detected.

References

Cygnus (constellation)
K-type supergiants
Spectroscopic binaries
Cygni, Xi
104060
8079
200905
A-type main-sequence stars
Cygni, 62
Durchmusterung objects